Four ships of the United States Navy have been named USS Biddle, in honor of Captain Nicholas Biddle.

  was a torpedo boat in service from 1901 to 1919.
  was a destroyer commissioned 1918 and in use until 1945.
  was a guided missile destroyer commissioned in 1962 and renamed Claude V. Ricketts in 1964.
  was a guided missile cruiser in service from 1967 to 1993.

One ship of the United States Navy has been named USS Biddle, in honor of Major General William P. Biddle, USMC.

  was an attack transport in service from 1941 to 1946.

References

United States Navy ship names